The Kültürpark Cup is a tennis tournament held on outdoor hard courts at Kültürpark Tenis Kulübü in İzmir, Turkey. It has been held since 2017 and is part of the ITF Women's Circuit as a $60,000 event.

Past finals

Singles

Doubles

External links 
 

ITF Women's World Tennis Tour
Hard court tennis tournaments
Tennis tournaments in Turkey
Recurring sporting events established in 2017
Kültürpark